Douglas Thornley is an American architect. He is a principal at Goring & Straja Architects in San Francisco, California in the United States. Previously, Thornley was a lead architect at Gould Evans Architects  and Baum Thornley Architects prior to a merger with Gould Evans Architects. He has designed private residencies and wineries. His first winery work was in 1998. He is also known for his kitchen design in homes and commercial establishments, including a home designed by Joseph Eichler.

Notable projects 
 Cuvaison, Napa Valley and Calistoga, California
 Lynmar Estate, Sebastopol, California
 Moggridge Residence, Woodside, California
 Paraduxx Winery, Napa, California 
 Brown Residence, San Francisco, California, 2005
 Ma(i)sonry Napa Valley, Yountville, California, 2008

References

Living people
Architects from California
People from the San Francisco Bay Area
Year of birth missing (living people)